Game2: Winter was a social experiment and media stunt promoted as a Russian survival reality television program produced by Novosibirsk entrepreneur Yevgeny Pyatkovsky that was set to premiere in July 2017. The show caught the attention of the press when the show stated that its rules would allow crimes such as rape and murder which sparked outrage online. The show has been compared to a "real-life Hunger Games".

The project was revealed to be a social experiment used for marketing research purposes on 31 May 2017.

Background 
30 participants, half men and half women, were expected to compete on a remote Siberian island in the Ob River for a 100 million rouble ($1.7 million) prize on a nine-month survival mission.
All contestants were said to have signed death waivers and agreed not to hold the organisers accountable for criminal activity.

However, Snopes found that 'Despite multiple misleading headlines, the waiver described by news outlets explicitly stated that contestants on the show would be obliged to "obey the laws of the Russian Federation".'

Production

Location 
The production's home base was in Western Siberia, with the Ob River area proposed as the main filming location.

Casting call 
On November 16, 2016, the production team posted a casting call via their VK account. Registration was closed on April 18, 2017 with over 340 applications.

As of May 2017, 120 people had qualified for runoff voting. The 30 finalists were set to be revealed that June.

Broadcasting 
According to The Guardian, "five countries have already expressed the desire to broadcast [the show] for their audiences".

References

External links 

 Official website
 
 

Unaired television shows
Adventure reality television series
Russian reality television series
Works about survival skills
Television shows filmed in Russia
Television shows set in Siberia